Melvyn op der Heijde (born 11 June 1975) is a Dutch former professional tennis player.

Born in Hoorn, North Holland in 1975, Op der Heijde came late to professional tennis. As a 21-year old in 1996 he was playing in the third division of club tennis, but made improvements when he switched to Amstelpark. In 1999 he earned an international ranking and had a surprise win over leading Dutch player Paul Haarhuis, as well as securing his first ITF Futures title in Verona. During his career he won six singles and three doubles tournaments at Futures level. He achieved a best world ranking of 231 and featured in the qualifying draws in three of the four grand slams.

ITF Futures titles

Singles: (6)

Doubles: (3)

References

External links
 
 

1975 births
Living people
Dutch male tennis players
Sportspeople from North Holland
People from Hoorn